Polish Navy Shipyard is a Polish shipyard company located in Gdynia. It primary responsibility is the construction and repair of the Polish Navy ships. The shipyard founded in 1922, it is faced a bankruptcy and liquidation before it was bought out. In 2017, Polish Navy Shipyard took over by Polish Armaments Group.

References

External links
 

Shipyards of Poland
Polish brands
Gdynia
1922 establishments in Poland
Vehicle manufacturing companies established in 1922
Polish Navy
Defence companies of Poland